Ausa is a Town and Municipal Council in Latur District  in the state of Maharashtra, India. It is also the headquarters for Ausa Taluka One of the ten talukas in latur .

Geography 
It has an average elevation of 634 metres (2080 feet).

History 
When Ausa was a Taluka, the recent Latur district place was a just part of this big Ausa Taluka. Ausa is as it is, but, Latur developed as a big city and a district place having more than 5 lac population. Ausa has an ancient fort. It was developed in es1200 and an iconic temple in the town is of the warkari saints Veernath and Mallinath Maharaj Ausekar.

Agriculture 
Around the Killari area, grape production is large and is an important export. In the Almala village are famous for production in Sugarcane. Bhada and Warwada villages are famous for producing carrots in whole district. The major river in  Ausa is Tavaraja and Terana. It is a large market for livestock like cows, buffaloes, goats in both the Latur and Osmanabad districts.

Demographics 
 India census, Ausa had a population of 30,876. Males constitute 51% of the population and females 49%.  16% of the population is under 6 years of age. Marathi and Urdu are widely spoken by the people here.

References 

Cities and towns in Latur district
Talukas in Maharashtra